Zeros and Ones is a 2021 American-Italian thriller film written and directed by Abel Ferrara and starring Ethan Hawke.

It premiered at the 74th Locarno Film Festival in August 2021, and was released in limited theaters, on demand, and digital platforms on November 19, 2021.

Plot

"...an American soldier-for-hire (Ethan Hawke) attempting to foil a plot to blow up the Vatican in a locked-down Rome."

Cast
Ethan Hawke as JJ/Justin 
Phil Neilson as Phil
 Valerio Mastandrea as Luciano
Valeria Correale as Valeria
Babak Karimi as Mullah
Korlan Madi as Jiao
Stephen Gurewitz as Stephen 
Mahmut Sifa Erkaya as Ari
Zixuan Chen as Jiao's Son
Sebastian Mendizabal as Mustapha

Production
In November 2020, it was announced that Ethan Hawke, Cristina Chiriac, and Phil Nelson had joined the cast, with Abel Ferrara directing from his screenplay.

Principal photography began in November 2020 in Italy.

Awards
 2021 – 74th Locarno Film Festival: Best Direction Award Abel Ferrara.

References

External links
 

2021 films
2021 thriller films
2020s English-language films
American thriller films
Films directed by Abel Ferrara
Films scored by Joe Delia
Films shot in Italy
Italian thriller films
English-language Italian films
Lionsgate films
2020s American films